Kaul (also spelled Koul) is a surname used by the Kashmiri Pandit community in India.

The word Koul, meaning well born, is derived from Kula, the Sanskrit term for family or clan.

Origins
There are several theories regarding the origins of Kaul as a surname.

Koul from Mahakoul
One says that it is associated with the word Mahakoul, an epithet for Shiva. Shiva followers were thus called Kaula. Koul therefore means a devotee of Shiva.

Koul/Kaul from Shakta worship 
Another states that since the Saraswat Brahmins of Kas'mira were believers in Shaivism and Shakta, the peak of Shaivism in Kashmir around the 9th–12th century gave rise to use of the name. This has led many scholars to believe that almost all Kashmiri Pandits were Kauls/Koul and they were later subdivided into different nicknames, then with the passage of time these nicknames became surnames. In recent years the use of the nicknames is being progressively discarded and the surname Kaul/Koul  is being adopted by almost all such people. The word Kaul/Koul is associated with being an aghoreshwara or enlightened. The practitioners (sadhaks) of the Tantra, associated with Shakti worship, are believed to reach the top of the spiritual ladder, and thus become a Kaul/Koul.

Notable people with Kaul surname

 Anita Kaul (1954–2016), Indian Administrative Service officer
 Bansi Kaul (born 1949), Indian writer and theatre director
 Bharat Kaul, Bengali Actor
 Brij Mohan Kaul, commanded the Indian forces in the Sino-Indian War
 Ekta Kaul (born 1987), Indian television actress
 Hari Kishan Kaul (1869–1942), Kashmiri politician and author
 Josh Kaul (b. 1980), 45th Attorney General of Wisconsin
 Kailas Nath Kaul (1905–1983), Indian botanist and agricultural scientist, brother of Kamala
 Kamala Kaul Nehru (1899–1936), Indian freedom fighter and wife of first Indian Prime Minister Jawaharlal Nehru
 Kanchi Kaul, Indian TV actress and model
Krishna Kaul , Indian rapper, known as KR$NA, and formerly as Prozpekt
 Mahendra Kaul (1922–2018), British BBC broadcaster and television presenter
 Manav Kaul, Indian theatre director, playwright, actor and film-maker
 Mani Kaul (1944–2011), Indian film director
 Manohar Kaul (1925–1999), Indian painter
 Matthias Kaul (1949–2020), German musician
 P. K. Kaul (1929-2007), ambassador of India to the United States (1986–1989)
 Raj Kaul, Nehru family patriarch
 Robert H. Kaul (1911–2000), Associate Justice of the Kansas Supreme Court
 Siddarth Kaul (born 1990), Indian cricketer, medium pace bowler
 Sheila Kaul (1915–2015) Indian politician, cabinet minister 
 S. K. Kaul (born 1934), Air Chief Marshal of the Indian Air Force, Chief of Air Staff (India) 1993–1995
 Triloki Nath Kaul (1913–2000), Indian diplomat, Indian Foreign Secretary 1967–1972
 V. N. Kaul (born 1943), Indian civil servant, Comptroller and Auditor General 2002–2008
 Sanjay Kaul (born 1962), Indian businessman and founder of the University of Petroleum and Energy Studies
 Sanjay Kishan Kaul (b.1958), Judge, Supreme Court of India and former lawyer

Notable people with Koul surname 

 Anil Koul (born 1972), Indian pharmacologist
 Omkar Nath Koul (1941–2018), Indian linguist
 Scaachi Koul (born 1991), Canadian journalist and writer
 Shadi Lal Koul (1954–2020), Kashmiri actor

See also 
 Kaula

References

Surnames
Indian surnames
Hindu surnames
Kashmiri tribes
Kashmiri-language surnames